The 2012–13 Croatian First Football League (officially known as the MAXtv Prva Liga for sponsorship reasons) was the 22nd season of the Croatian First Football League, the national championship for men's association football teams in Croatia, since its establishment in 1992. The season started on 21 July 2012 and ended on 26 May 2013.

The league was contested by 12 teams, down from 16 in the previous season. Dinamo Zagreb were the defending champions, having won their seventh consecutive title in 2011–12.

Format changes
The league was contested by twelve teams, four fewer than in the previous season, with each club playing every other club three times for a total of 33 rounds (last time the system was used in the 2008–09 season). On 13 April 2012, Croatian Football Federation announced that the first stage of licensing procedure for 2012–13 season was completed. For the 2012–13 Prva HNL, only three out of twenty applied clubs were issued a top level license: Dinamo Zagreb, Lokomotiva and NK Zagreb. In the second stage of licensing procedure clubs that didn't get a license appealed on the decision and provided new facts and arguments. On 15 May 2012, it was announced that all remaining Prva HNL clubs from the previous season were granted top level license, except for Šibenik, Karlovac and Varaždin. Only one team from Druga HNL acquired the top level license: Hrvatski Dragovoljac, however, they didn't manage to finish the season within top two places which would secure them promotion. Since none of the top two teams from Druga HNL acquired top level license, the 12th placed team from the 2011–12 Prva HNL were allowed to stay. If that wasn't the case, Inter Zaprešić and Rijeka would have needed to play a two-legged play-off match to decide who gets relegated since they were equal on all of the tiebreakers.

Teams
The following is a complete list of teams which contested the 2012–13 Prva HNL.

Stadia and locations

Personnel and kits

Managerial changes

League table

Results
Every team will play three times against each other team for a total of 33 matches. The first 22 matchdays will consist of a regular double round-robin schedule. The league standings at this point will then be used to determine the games for the last 11 matchdays.

Matches 1–22

Matches 23–33

Top goalscorers
As of 21 July 2013; Source:  Sportnet.hr UEFA.com

Awards

Annual awards

See also
2012–13 Croatian Second Football League
2012–13 Croatian Football Cup

References

External links
 
Prva HNL at UEFA.com

2012-13
Cro
2012–13 in Croatian football